Christopher William Young (born 1994) is a British actor. He began his career in theatre, earning an Ian Charleson Award nomination. He stars as Jesper Fahey in the Netflix fantasy series Shadow and Bone (2021–). His films include The School for Good and Evil (2022) and The Origin (2022).

Early life and education
Young was born in Oxford to a Scottish father and a Ugandan mother and raised in Abingdon-on-Thames. He attended Abingdon School from 2008 to 2013; he was a member of the Abingdon Film Unit and played the lead role in the school’s 2012 senior production of Candide.

Young was a member of the National Youth Theatre. He had a few minor and ensemble roles, such as in the television film Walter's War and the Oxford Playhouse productions of Cinderella and Dick Whittington. He went on to train at the Royal Academy of Dramatic Art (RADA), graduating with a Bachelor of Arts in Acting in 2017.

Career
Post graduation from RADA, Young played the lead in The Extraordinary Cabaret of Dorian Gray at the 2017 Underbelly Theatre Festival in South Bank. He also joined the UK tour of The Real Thing as Billy. In 2018, he played Octavius in a production of Julius Caesar at the Bridge Theatre, the Journalist in a production of The Prime of Miss Jean Brodie at Donmar Warehouse, and Malcolm in Macbeth at the Sam Wanamaker Playhouse at the Globe Theatre.

Young made his television debut in 2019 with a guest role in Endeavour. He also appeared in the Dylan Holmes Williams directed short The Devil's Harmony. That spring and summer, he played Lysander in A Midsummer Night's Dream at Bridge Theatre alongside Gwendoline Christie, which earned him an Ian Charleson Award nomination.

In October 2019, it was announced Young would star as Jesper Fahey the 2021 Netflix series Shadow and Bone, an adaptation of fantasy book series The Grisha Trilogy and the Six of Crows Duology by Leigh Bardugo. His performance was singled out by several publications.
He has film roles in The Origin and the Netflix adaptation of The School for Good and Evil.

Filmography

Film and television

Music videos

Stage

Awards and nominations

See also
 List of Old Abingdonians

References

External links
 

Living people
1994 births
21st-century English male actors
Actors from Oxford
Alumni of RADA
Black British male actors
English male Shakespearean actors
English male stage actors
English male television actors
English people of Scottish descent
English people of Ugandan descent
Male actors from Oxfordshire
National Youth Theatre members
People educated at Abingdon School
People from Abingdon-on-Thames